The Stade Camille-Lebon is a stadium in Angoulême, France. It is used mostly for football matches and is the home ground of Angoulême Charente FC. The stadium is able to hold 6,500 people.

External links
World Stadiums entry

Angoulême Charente FC
Lebon
Sports venues in Charente
Angoulême